The 1899–1900 season was the eighth in the history of the Western Football League.

Bristol Rovers were the champions of Division One, and also competed in the Southern League during this season, along with all the other members of Division One. The Division Two champions were debutants Bristol East.

Division One
One new club joined Division One, which was reduced to just four clubs from seven after Trowbridge Town and Warmley resigned during the previous season, and Bristol St George and Southampton left at the end of the season.
Bristol City rejoined from the Southern League though, like the other three clubs, they played in both leagues.
Bristol Eastville Rovers changed their name to Bristol Rovers.

Division Two
Two new clubs joined Division Two, which was reduced to five clubs after Barton Hill, Bristol Amateurs, Hanham, Midsomer Norton and Mount Hill all left at the end of the previous season.
Bristol East
Weston (Bath)

References

1899-1900
1899–1900 in English association football leagues